Bollebeek is a hamlet in the municipality of Asse, Flemish Brabant, Belgium. It was part of the village of Mollem.

It has a 13th-century church tower.

Populated places in Flemish Brabant